Sameera Moussa (March 3, 1917 – August 5, 1952) was the first female Egyptian nuclear physicist. Sameera held a doctorate in atomic radiation. She  hoped her work would one day lead to affordable medical treatments and the peaceful use of atomic energy. She organized the Atomic Energy for Peace Conference and sponsored a call that set an international conference under the banner "Atoms for Peace." She was the first woman to work at Cairo University.

Youth and college 

Moussa was born in Egypt in Gharbia Governorate in 1917. Her mother died from cancer, and her father was a famous political activist. He moved with his daughter to Cairo and invested his money in a small hotel in the El-Hussein region. At the insistence of her father, Moussa attended Kaser El-Shok primary school, one of the oldest schools in Cairo. After she completed her primary education, she joined the Banat El-Ashraf school, which was built and managed by her father.

Despite the fact that Moussa achieved high grades in her secondary education, and could have pursued a career in engineering, she insisted on joining the Faculty of Sciences at Cairo University. In 1939, Moussa obtained a BSc in radiology with first class honors after researching the effects of X-ray radiation on various materials. Dr. Moustafa Mousharafa, the first dean of the faculty, believed in his student enough to help her become a remarkable lecturer at the faculty. Afterwards, she became the first assistant professor at the same faculty, the first woman to hold a university post, and the first to have obtained a PhD in atomic radiation.

Nuclear research 
Moussa believed in Atoms for Peace. She was known to say "My wish is for nuclear treatment of cancer to be as available and as cheap as Aspirin". She worked hard for this purpose and throughout her intensive research, she came up with a historic equation that would help break the atoms of cheap metals such as copper, paving the way for a cheap nuclear bomb.

Moussa organized the Atomic Energy for Peace Conference and sponsored a call for setting an international conference under the banner "Atom for Peace", where many prominent scientists were invited. The conference made a number of recommendations for setting up a committee to protect against nuclear hazards, for which she strongly advocated. Moussa also volunteered to help treat cancer patients at various hospitals especially since her mother went through a fierce battle against this disease.

Visits to the United States 

Moussa received a scholarship from the Fulbright Atomic in order to be acquainted with the modern research facilities at California University. In recognition of her pioneering nuclear research, she was given permission to visit the secret US atomic facilities.  The visit raised vehement debate in United States academic and scientific circles since she was the first non-white person to be granted that privilege.

She turned down several offers that required her to live in the United States and to be granted the American citizenship saying "Egypt, my dear homeland, is waiting for me".

Authored works 
Dr. Sameera Moussa was the first assistant professor at the school of Sciences at Cairo University and more impressively the first woman at the university to obtain a university post due to her groundbreaking PhD in atomic radiation from the 1940s. Inspired by the contribution of earlier Muslim scientists, including her teacher, Dr. Moustafa Mashrafa, Sameera began writing an article on the work done by Muhammad ibn Musa al-Khwarizmi in founding algebra. She also authored multiple articles that communicate the theory behind nuclear energy, its impact, and safety of their use in simpler terms. She also discussed the history of the atom and its structure, and dangers of nuclear fission technology, as well as the properties of radiation and their biological effects.

Death 
On August 5, 1952 after her first visit to America she intended to return home, but she was invited on a trip. On the way, the car fell from a height of 40 feet, which killed her immediately. It has been alleged that the Israeli Mossad murdered Moussa , aided by a Jewish-Egyptian actress, Raqya Ibrahim (Rachael Abraham).

Awards and honors 

In recognition to her efforts, she was granted many awards. Among them were:

 1953, when she was honored by the Egyptian Army.
 1981, when she was awarded the Order of Science and Arts, First Class, by then-President Anwar Sadat.
 A laboratory at the Faculty of Science and a school in her village were named after her.
 The Egyptian TV transmitted a serial titled The Immortal dramatizing her biography.
 In 1998, while celebrating the Egyptian Woman Day, it was decided to establish a cultural solace in her birthplace bearing her name.
 A book was published covering her life and scientific contributions.

See also
List of Israeli assassinations
Ali Moustafa Mosharafa
Said Bedair

References 

1917 births
1952 deaths
20th-century Egyptian people
Egyptian nuclear physicists
Egyptian physicists
Egyptian women physicists
Road incident deaths in California
Cairo University alumni
20th-century women scientists
Egyptian women scientists
Women nuclear physicists
People from Gharbia Governorate
Fulbright alumni